Digitalmindsoft, also known as DMS, is a German video game developer. The company was founded in July 2006 and is located in Ulm, Germany. The company is famous for working alongside Best Way, a Ukrainian game developer. Together they worked on Men of War and Men of War: Assault Squad, both of which were published by 1C Company, in 2009 and 2011 respectively.

List of developed games
2009 – Men of War
2011 – Men of War: Assault Squad
2012 – Men of War: Assault Squad - Game Of The Year Edition
2014 – Men of War: Assault Squad 2
2016 - Assault Squad 2: Men of War Origins
2018 - Call to Arms
2019 - Men of War: Assault Squad 2 - Cold War
2021 - Call to Arms - Gates of Hell: Ostfront

References

External links
 

Video game companies of Germany
Video game development companies
Video game companies established in 2006